Kirzhach is a town and the administrative center of Kirzhachsky District in Vladimir Oblast, Russia, located on the Kirzhach River in the west of the oblast,  west of Vladimir and  south of Alexandrov. Population:

Etymology
The town is named after the Kirzhach River. The root of the name (kirzh) corresponds to a Moksha or Erzya word meaning "left".

History
It was established in the 14th century as a sloboda assigned to the Annunciation Monastery. The latter was established by Saint Sergius of Radonezh, who lived in the area between 1354 and 1358. After the monastery was disbanded in 1764, the sloboda was granted municipal rights in 1778. Thereafter, Kirzhach, as many other towns in the vicinity, developed primarily as a textile center.

On October 12, 2004, the settlement of Krasny Oktyabr was merged with the town.

Administrative and municipal status
Within the framework of administrative divisions, Kirzhach serves as the administrative center of Kirzhachsky District, to which it is directly subordinated. As a municipal division, the town of Kirzhach is incorporated within Kirzhachsky Municipal District as Kirzhach Urban Settlement.

Climate
City's climate is moderately continental: a warm summer, a cold winter with a moderate spring and fall. It averages 151 days per year with temperatures above . A snow cover is present for four to five months; snow starts to fall usually at the end of November or at the beginning of December. Snow melts on sun-covered places in the middle of April and in forests at the end of April.

Demographics

Architecture and landmarks
Kirzhach is famous for its great monastery—Blagoveschensky cathedral. The diminutive katholikon, erected during the reign of Ivan the Terrible, conforms to the early Muscovite type of cathedral church. It is commonly regarded as one of the last and loveliest specimens of this conservative strain. The monastery's open gallery connects the cathedral with the nearby Savior church, which has a square tower and a tent-like belfry. This church is a tomb of prominent Russian boyars-Miloslavskys. 

The 16th-century church was demolished during the Soviet time, but people began to rebuild it in 1990s. Today the cathedral is a convent. Since 1997, the monastery possesses the relics of the Russian Saint, Roman Kirzhachsky, the student of another great Russian saint, Sergey Radonezhsky. Tourists can see two ancient St. Nikolay's churches—one was built in 1764, the other in 1846. 

On the local art palace's facade is a plaque that commemorates the meeting of Yuri Gagarin, the world's first spaceman, with local people on 29 March 1963. On 27 March 1968, 18 km from Kirzhach (near the village of Novoselovo), Gagarin and flight instructor Vladimir Seryogin died in a plane crash. A large memorial, museum and visitors spot have been built on the crash site. Tourists can also see the buildings of shopping malls, built in the 1850s.

References

Notes

Sources

External links

Cities and towns in Vladimir Oblast
Pokrovsky Uyezd